R705 road may refer to:
 R705 road (Ireland)
 R705 (South Africa)